Blythe Masters (born 22 March 1969) is a British Private Equity executive and former financial services and fintech executive. She is a former executive at JPMorgan Chase, where she was widely credited as the creator of the credit default swap as a financial instrument. She is founding partner of FinTech private equity firm, Motive Partners, CEO of Motive Capital Corp, an Advisory Board Member of the US Chamber of Digital Commerce, a Board Member of GCM Grosvenor, Forge Global, CAIS Group, and Credit Suisse Group.

Biography

Education
Born in Oxford, Masters was raised in the south-east of England. She attended The King's School in Canterbury. She graduated in 1991 from Trinity College, Cambridge with a B.A. in economics.

Professional career

JP Morgan Chase
Masters joined the bank JP Morgan Chase in 1991 after completing a number of internships there while still a student dating back to 1987. Responsible for credit derivative products at J.P. Morgan, Masters became a managing director at 28, the youngest woman to achieve that status in the firm's history. She is widely credited with creating the modern credit default swap, a derivative used to manage credit exposure to underlying reference entities. In 1994, J.P. Morgan had extended a $4.8 billion credit line to Exxon, which faced the threat of $5 billion in punitive damages for the Exxon Valdez oil spill. A team of J.P. Morgan bankers led by Masters then purchased credit protection against the credit line to the European Bank of Reconstruction and Development to cut the capital which J.P. Morgan was required to hold against Exxon's default, thus reducing its own risk. J.P. Morgan later bundled together packages of such exposures and offered them to market as BISTRO, for Broad Index Secured Trust Offering, and these new financial instruments were quickly adopted by other banking institutions.

When derivatives played a role in the 2008 financial crisis, having been applied by other firms to sub-prime mortgages, Gillian Tett's book, Fool's Gold: How the Bold Dreams of a Small Tribe at J.P. Morgan Was Corrupted by Wall Street Greed and Unleashed a Catastrophe, documented how the original intent and features of credit derivatives had been distorted. Nonetheless, Masters was described by the UK newspaper The Guardian as "the woman who invented financial weapons of mass destruction". The paper later apologised for failing to give Masters an adequate opportunity to respond to their characterisation. She had told the newspaper: "I do believe CDS [credit default swaps] have been miscast, much as poor workmen tend to blame their tools." Masters explained to The Economist, "Tools that transfer risk can also increase systemic risk if major counterparties fail to manage their exposures properly." In April 2010 she told the Economic and Monetary Affairs Committee of the European Parliament that "there are definitely lessons that have to be learnt. I for one feel that I have learnt from that experience and there are things I may like to have seen done differently". She stated support for reforms which increase transparency and reduce the risk of contagion among financial firms.

From 2001 to 2004, Masters served as the bank's head of Global Credit Portfolio and Credit Policy and Strategy. From 2004 to 2007, she was Chief Financial Officer of J.P. Morgan's Investment Bank. In 2007 she was named head of Global Commodities. By 2014, J.P. Morgan had the largest revenues of any investment bank in commodities, according to United Kingdom analytics firm Coalition. That same year, J.P. Morgan announced the sale of its physical commodities business for $3.5bn in the face of increased regulatory scrutiny brought on by a Federal Energy Regulatory Commission investigation into the bank’s alleged manipulation of energy markets in California and Michigan.  J.P. Morgan paid $410 million to settle the investigation without admitting wrongdoing. J.P. Morgan defended Masters, stating that "We strongly dispute that Blythe Masters or any employee lied or acted inappropriately in this matter". Masters left J.P. Morgan once she had completed the sale for the bank.

Masters was the Chair of the Securities Industry and Financial Markets Association from 2008 to 2010 and also of the Global Financial Markets Association from 2012 to 2014, trade associations whose missions include promoting public trust and confidence in financial markets. She has frequently represented the industry in Washington D.C. on matters including the design of carbon markets to contain global warming,  curbs on large commodities trading positions and the financial regulatory overhaul.

2015-2019
Masters was named the CEO of Digital Asset Holdings in March 2015, a company that builds secure and distributed processing tools to speed up settlement, reduce costs and enhance security and transparency in regulated industries. The startup raised more than $100 million in multiple rounds of funding from fifteen technology and financial firms, such as Citibank, Goldman Sachs, JPMorgan, Deutsche Boerse, DTCC, CME, IBM and Accenture. The company distributed ledger systems for the ASX, DTCC and others. In December 2017, ASX officially announced it would upgrade its post-trade settlement system to a blockchain platform designed by Digital Asset Holdings.

In December 2018, Masters announced that she was stepping down as CEO, but would remain a board member, strategic advisor and a shareholder.

In December 2015, it was posited in the media that the new Barclays CEO Jes Staley had approached Masters about running the bank’s investment banking division, however Masters indicated she was fully committed to her current role at Digital Asset Holdings. From 2015 to 2016 she was the Chair of the Board of Santander Consumer Holdings Inc. (NYSE: SC), a full-service, technology-driven consumer finance company.

Private Equity
In late 2019 Masters joined Motive Capital Partners, a private equity firm. In September, 2021 Motive announced that she was leading Motive's acquisition of Forge Global, a pre-IPO stock marketplace, in a SPAC transaction valued at approximately $2 billion.

Personal life
Masters is Co-Chair of the Board of the Global Fund for Women, a board member of both The Breast Cancer Research Foundation and ID2020, and the former Chair of the Board of the Greater NY Affiliate of the breast cancer charity, Susan G. Komen for the Cure. She is an amateur equestrian.

References

External links
 
 Crains New York 40 Under 40 Profile
 The Daily Pennsylvanian

Living people
1969 births
English economists
British women economists
JPMorgan Chase people
People from Oxford
Women chief executives
People associated with cryptocurrency